Fernanda Labraña (born 13 March 1999) is a Chilean tennis player.

Labraña has a career-high singles ranking by the Women's Tennis Association (WTA) of 704, achieved on 3 October 2022. She also has a career-high doubles ranking by the WTA of 412, achieved on 3 October 2022. Up to date, she has won six doubles titles in tournaments of the ITF Women's Circuit.

Labraña competes for Chile in the Billie Jean King Cup, where she has accumulated a win/loss record of 1–0.

She attended college at the University of Texas at Austin.

ITF Circuit finals

Doubles: 12 (6 titles, 6 runner-ups)

References

External links
 
 
 
 Fernanda Labraña at the University of Texas at Austin

1999 births
Living people
Chilean female tennis players
Tennis players from Santiago
Texas Longhorns women's tennis players
21st-century Chilean women